Joost van der Burg (born 11 December 1993) is a Dutch professional racing cyclist. He rode in the men's team pursuit at the 2016 UCI Track Cycling World Championships but he crashed in the qualification.

References

External links
 
 

1993 births
Living people
Dutch male cyclists
Place of birth missing (living people)
Dutch track cyclists
Olympic cyclists of the Netherlands
Cyclists at the 2016 Summer Olympics
People from Pijnacker-Nootdorp
Cyclists from South Holland
20th-century Dutch people
21st-century Dutch people